Janez Ožbolt (born 22 August 1970) is a Slovenian biathlete. He competed at five consecutive Winter Olympics, from 1992 to 2006.

See also
 List of athletes with the most appearances at Olympic Games

References

1970 births
Living people
Slovenian male biathletes
Olympic biathletes of Slovenia
Biathletes at the 1992 Winter Olympics
Biathletes at the 1994 Winter Olympics
Biathletes at the 1998 Winter Olympics
Biathletes at the 2002 Winter Olympics
Biathletes at the 2006 Winter Olympics
People from the Municipality of Loška Dolina